Lissorchiidae is a family of flatworms belonging to the order Plagiorchiida.

Genera

Genera:
 Alloplagiorchis Simer, 1931
 Asaccotrema Sokolov & Gordeev, 2019
 Asymphylodora Looss, 1899

References

Platyhelminthes